Hussards means hussars in French.

It may also refer to:
Hussards de Saxe, a cavalry unit set up in France under the Ancien Régime
Hussards (literary movement), a French literary movement in the 1950s
Les Hussards, a French comedy film from 1955